Escape from Angola is a 1976 adventure film directed by Leslie H. Martinson. It stars Stan Brock and Anne Collings and was co-produced by Ivan Tors whose children act in the film with Ivan making a cameo appearance. According to the film all the animal catching scenes were filmed during actual conditions when the rare animals had to be rounded up and relocated in safer areas.

Plot
In an unnamed African nation the Mallory family devotes their life to animal conversation. A terrorist group called the GVN seek to destroy a dam providing power and chase out another animal conservationist. When their Land Rover is sabotaged the Mallory family goes their separate ways to safety.

Cast
 Stan Brock as James Mallory
 Anne Collings as Karen Mallory
 Steven Tors as Steve Mallory
 Peter Tors as Peter Mallory
 David Tors as Dave Mallory
 Ivan Tors as Lars Olaffson
 Mackson Ngobeni as Tshoma
 Shirley Pelle as Ogamo Woman
 Jannie Wienand as Kruse
 Joe Mafela as	Patrol Leader

References

External links

1976 films
Films directed by Leslie H. Martinson
1970s English-language films